Cambio de Piel is the seventh studio album released by Mexican singer Alejandra Guzmán. It was released in 1996.

Track listing
 "Guerra Fría"   (Juan Antonio Castillo; Tito Dávila)
 "Ven"  (Octavio Muñoz)
 "Toda la Mitad" (Antonio García de Diego; Fernando Bastante; Pancho Varona)
 "Como Las Nueces"  (Juan Antonio Castillo; Tito Dávila)
 "Larga Distancia de Ansiedad"  (Alejandra Guzmán; Jorge Amaro)
 "Quema Despacio"  (Octavio Muñoz)
 "Cuenta Conmigo"  (Pedro Guerra)
 "Tocarte"  (Cristina Gónzalez)
 "Recordaras"  (Nacho Bejar)
 "Buscando Tu Amor" (Fernando López Escobar; Tito Dávila)

Singles

1994 albums
Alejandra Guzmán albums